Maine-Soroa Airport  is an airport serving Maine-Soroa in Niger.

Airports in Niger